Pierre Kompany (born on 8 September 1947) is a Belgian politician of the CDH. He was elected mayor of Ganshoren in 2018 and is the father of the footballer Vincent Kompany. He is the first Congolese mayor in Belgium.

Kompany was born in the Belgian Congo and came to Belgium in 1975 as a political refugee from Zaïre. He worked as a mechanical engineer before entering politics.

In 2014, he was elected to the Parliament of the Brussels-Capital Region, and he was re-elected in 2019.

Notes

1947 births
People from Bukavu
Living people
Belgian mechanical engineers
Mayors of places in Belgium
Democratic Republic of the Congo emigrants to Belgium